Statistics of Czechoslovak First League in the 1972–73 season.

Overview
It was contested by 16 teams, and FC Spartak Trnava won the championship. Ladislav Józsa was the league's top scorer with 21 goals.

Stadia and locations

Table

Results

Top goalscorers

References

Czechoslovak First League seasons
Czech
1972–73 in Czechoslovak football